SPAR, originally DESPAR, styled as DE SPAR, is a Dutch-French multinational that provides branding, supplies and support services for independently owned and operated food retail stores. It was founded in the Netherlands in 1932, by Adriaan van Well, and  consists of 13,623 stores in 48 countries.

Its headquarters are located in Amsterdam. The company operates a partnership programme and has a presence in most European countries, as well as many others throughout Asia, Africa and Oceania.

In fiscal year 2021, SPAR earned €41.2 billion in global sales, which represented a 3.3 percent increase over the previous year.

Etymology
The name was originally DESPAR, an acronym of the Dutch phrase , which was used by Van Well to describe the brand. The acronym was chosen to resonate with the verb sparen, which (related to English spare) means "save [money]" in Dutch and some other languages, among them German and Scandinavian languages (with variants such as spara or spare). "Spar" is Dutch for  "spruce tree", after which the logo was chosen. As the organisation expanded across Europe, the name was abbreviated by dropping the DE prefix.

There are some international naming variants:
 In Hungary, 17 stores owned by SPAR located at Lukoil filling stations operate under the name DESPAR. However, there are also many SPAR and INTERSPAR locations.
 In Italy, the name is still DESPAR, though in keeping with the international branding, the SPAR section of the logo is highlighted, and the larger shops are still called EuroSPAR and InterSPAR.
 In Austria, DESPAR is SPAR's Italian food product range. There are also INTERSPAR locations within Austria.
 In Croatia, SPAR and INTERSPAR locations run concurrently.
In Arabia, the Latin letters SPAR are displayed next to the Arabic سبار (sbār).
In Iran, it is called اسپار (Aspar).
In China, it is known as 斯巴超市 (Sībā chāoshì, "Siba supermarket").
In Ireland, as well in Russia both the SPAR and EUROSPAR names are used, with EUROSPAR being used mostly for larger supermarket sized stores and SPAR for smaller convenience stores.

History

Spar was founded in 1932, in the South Holland town of Zegwaart (now part of Zoetermeer). In 1953, an International Spar office opened in Amsterdam to control and further develop the organisation throughout Europe and other continents. Many Spar shops are in Europe, but they can also be found in a number of countries outside of Europe, such as Australia, Oman, Saudi Arabia, Qatar, United Arab Emirates, Nigeria, South Africa, Botswana, Namibia, Zimbabwe, Zambia, Mozambique, Seychelles, Sri Lanka, Cameroon, China, India. Spar opened in Vanuatu on 1 December 2009, ending Au Bon Marché's grocery monopoly.

A Spar shop may be owned independently, by a franchisee, or be part of a chain, depending on the model applied in any given country. The owners of the parent company vary from country to country and may include the shop owners themselves. The name and the current logo was most recently revised in 1968 by Raymond Loewy and has since remained unchanged.

In the United Kingdom Spar, founded in 1959, may be a supermarket or a convenience shop, and is more common in Northern Ireland than Great Britain. In 1997, Spar was introduced to most United Kingdom military bases by the Navy, Army and Air Force Institutes (Naafi), where it sells a variety of civilian and military products. In Ireland the Spar brand is known for neighbourhood shops and also the subformat Eurospar acting as mini-supermarkets.

Since 1996, the company has been a major sponsor of the European Athletic Association and its events.

The Dutch Spar is a member of Superunie, an inventory purchasing organisation for a number of otherwise unaffiliated supermarket brands.

In 1988, SPAR South Africa became a wholly owned subsidiary of Tiger Brands, a holding company with a large diversified portfolio,  however it was unbundled and listed as a separate company in 2004.
In July 2014, Spar Group South Africa opened its first supermarket in Angola but no expansion of the brand is planned for this market. Since 2021, the group has 100% of the BWG Group, which had outlets in Ireland and southern Britain.

In 2015, Ahold acquired all 35 hypermarkets and 14 supermarkets from Spar Czechia for more than 5.2 billion Czech koruna. and converted them into Albert super- and hypermarkets, however it had to divest itself of some shops in order not to have a monopoly.

The first SPAR shop in Oman was inaugurated in January 2015, in Muscat. Spar Oman has plans to open more shops over time as part of its expansion plans in Oman.  Spar opened its first store in Qatar in 2017, with the second store opening in 2018. A further two stores are planned for 2018.

SPAR opened in Saudi Arabia in 2017, sublicensed to Al-Sadhan Group  opening the first stores in Riyadh.

In 2017, Ceylon Biscuits Limited in Sri Lanka acquired a license to operate Spar brand in Sri Lanka as Spar Lanka. This is a joint venture of Ceylon Biscuits Limited and SPAR Group Ltd, South Africa. They opened the first store in Thalawathugoda, Colombo. The plan is to open 50 outlets in the country by 2023.

In 2020, there were more than 13,500 SPAR stores in 48 countries.

In 2022, Israeli supermarket chain Shufersal announced plans to open SPAR stores to Israel; with 10 stores to be opened in the first three years of operation.

Shop types

In most, but not all countries, SPAR operates shops of different types and sub-brands: SPAR Express, SPAR Neighbourhood, EuroSPAR and InterSPAR.

 EuroSPAR/SuperSPAR
The EuroSPAR name is used in Europe and SuperSPAR in South Africa. These are mid-sized supermarkets. They are designed to fit in a niche between convenience shops and traditional supermarkets.

 InterSPAR
These are hypermarkets and compete directly against major international chains such as Real, Carrefour, and Tesco.

 KwikSPAR

KwikSPAR (only found in South Africa) are a smaller quick stop shop for convenience. They are larger than the conventional SPAR Express but smaller than the normal SPAR. These stores tend to have extended trading hours, some even being 24-hour convenience stores.

SPAR Express

This is the smallest type of shop. They are designed for small sites and filling station forecourts, airports and train stations.

 SPAR Drive-Thru
There was a drive-through SPAR on the Cliftonville Road in Belfast, Northern Ireland. This has now been converted to a Centra shop, and retained the drive-through for a while afterwards, but now no longer has one.

 SPAR Gourmet
The Austrian Spar Group has around 50 supermarkets branded SPAR Gourmet, mainly in and around Vienna. They are smaller supermarkets that specialize in foods, with a reduced range of other household goods. They originate from the acquisition of retail units from the Julius Meinl coffee and tea chain in 2000.

International statistics (2021)

 48 countries
 255 distribution centres
 13,623 stores
 €41.2 billion total sales
 410,000 SPAR colleagues
 7.5 million m2 retail sales area
 14.5 million customers per day

See also

List of convenience stores

Notes

References

External links
 
 
 SPAR International - Annual Report 2019

Companies based in Amsterdam
Convenience stores
Defunct retail companies of Romania
Dutch brands
Multinational companies headquartered in the Netherlands
Purchasing consortia
Retail companies established in 1932
Supermarkets of Albania
Supermarkets of Austria
Supermarkets of Croatia
Supermarkets of Hungary
Supermarkets of India
Supermarkets of Northern Ireland
Supermarkets of Slovenia
Supermarkets of Spain
Supermarkets of the Czech Republic
Supermarkets of the Netherlands
Supermarkets of the Republic of Ireland
Convenience stores of the United Kingdom
Supermarkets of Ukraine
Supermarkets of Pakistan
Supermarkets of Portugal
Dutch companies established in 1932